Body scan may refer to:

 3D body scanning, for measuring the body, used in Ergonomics
 Full body scanner in airport security
 Full-body CT scan, in medical imaging
 The mindfulness practice of body-scanning